Enga Ooru Rasathi is a 1980 Indian Tamil-language film, directed and produced by N. S. Rajendran. The film stars Sudhakar, Raadhika, Goundamani and S. R. Vijaya.

Cast 

 Sudhakar
 Raadhika
 Goundamani
 Gandhimathi in Guest appearance
 S. R. Vijaya
 Latha
 C. K. Saraswathi
 Ambika
 Sethuraja
 Prabhakar
 G. Krishnamurthy
 Selvaraj
 C. R. S. Murthy
 Thirumurthy

Soundtrack 
The music was composed by Gangai Amaran.

References

External links 
 

1980 films
1980s Tamil-language films